

The Heinkel He 71 was a German single-seat monoplane, a smaller version of the two-seat Heinkel He 64. A low-wing monoplane with a fixed conventional landing gear, the prototype first flew with an open cockpit and a  Hirth HM 60 engine. It was later modified with an enclosed cabin and a  Hirth HM 4 engine. With additional fuel tanks to increase range it was used by German aviator Elly Beinhorn on a flight around Africa.

Specifications (He 71B)

References

Notes

Bibliography

1930s German sport aircraft
He 071
Low-wing aircraft
Aircraft first flown in 1933